Doowon Technical College  is a private college in Anseong, South Korea.  The current president is Jung, Sang-Whan (정상환).  The maximum enrollment capacity is 4,800.

Academics

The school's Korean name means "Doowon Engineering College," and engineering is the primary focus of education.  There are 17 academic departments at Doowon, covering fields such as mechanical engineering, digital electronics, information and communication, computer graphics, and architecture.

Location

The campus is located in Juksan-myeon, a rural district of Anseong city.

History

The college opened in 1994.  At the time, it bore the name Doowon Technical Junior College.  The name was changed in 1998.

See also
Education in South Korea
List of colleges and universities in South Korea

External links

Official School Website, in English

Vocational education in South Korea
Universities and colleges in Gyeonggi Province
Educational institutions established in 1994
1994 establishments in South Korea